An afghan is a blanket or shawl, usually knitted or crocheted. It is sometimes also called a "throw" of indeterminate size. Afghans are often used as bedspreads, or as a decoration on the back of couches or chairs.

Etymology
The word afghan refers to the people of Afghanistan. The use of afghan in the English language for a textile object goes back to at least 1831, when Thomas Carlyle mentioned "Afghaun shawls" in his Sartor Resartus. By 1860, Afghan as a noun, not an adjective, denoted a type of handicrafted object shown at state fairs and other exhibitions, along with patchwork and knitted quilts, and was being mentioned in novels:

Types and styles
There are many styles of afghans:

 Single-piece afghans are the simplest style to make and are especially popular with beginners. 
 Mile-a-minute afghans are usually made in a number of separate strips, with a minimum of stitches per strip, and then the strips are joined.
 Join-as-you-go afghans are made up of many different pieces, one of which begins where the last leaves off.
 Motif afghans are composed of many small motifs, squares, or blocks, such as a granny square. These motifs may be all of the same design or of different designs. However, to make it easier to join the motifs into an afghan, the blocks are typically the same size. Some favor the motif style because of its portability and versatility of design. The motif style is still a very popular and a complex design for making blankets, scarves, etc. Although not a requirement, an edge or border is most often added to nicely finish off the blanket.
 A graphghan is an afghan made by following a flat chart. This method uses a grid of colored squares to create a visual design. There are three main methods to making a graphghan: pixel crochet, corner-to-corner crochet, and tapestry crochet.

References

Blankets
Jackets
Shawls and wraps
Crochet